Burnley Creek is a stream in the municipalities of Trent Hills and Alnwick/Haldimand, Northumberland County, in Central Ontario, Canada. It is in the Great Lakes Basin and is a right tributary of Percy Creek.

Course
It flows east, passes under County Road 45, continues east through a portion of Peter's Woods Provincial Park, and reaches the community of Burnley where it flows under County Road 29. Burnley Creek passes into geographic Percy Township in the municipality of Trent Hills, and flows through the former mill pond of the community of Warkworth. Percy Creek flows via the Trent River to the Bay of Quinte on Lake Ontario.

See also
List of rivers of Ontario

References

Rivers of Northumberland County, Ontario